Tjerk Hidde Leegstra (January 27, 1912 – October 23, 1980) was an American and Dutch field hockey player. He became an American citizen in June 1955 and competed in the men's tournament at the 1956 Summer Olympics.

Leegstra was also a pilot for the Royal Netherlands Air Force before and during World War II.

References

External links
 

1912 births
1980 deaths
American male field hockey players
Dutch male field hockey players
Olympic field hockey players of the United States
Field hockey players at the 1956 Summer Olympics
Sportspeople from Surabaya
Dutch emigrants to the United States
Dutch aviators